Méntrida is a Spanish Denominación de Origen Protegida (DOP) for wines covering many municipalities in the northeast corner of the province of Toledo (Castile-La Mancha, Spain) and which is divided into three distinct areas: Talavera, Torrijos and Sagra-Toledo, with over  under vines, the majority (71%) being in Torrijos.

History
Wine has been produced in this region since at least the 16th century. For many centuries its main market was the city of Madrid though at the end of the 19th century wines were exported abroad and participated in international trade fairs.

Climate

Soils
The soils are sandy-clay with an average loose consistency. They are poor in nutrients and retain the available moisture well.

Grapes
Méntrida produces mainly red wines as the red grape variety Garnacha represents over 80% of the grapes planted. 

The authorised varieties are:

 Red: Cabernet Franc, Cencibel, Cabernet Sauvignon, Garnacha, Graciano, Merlot, Petit Verdot, and Syrah

 White: Albillo, Moscatel de Grano Menudo, Chardonnay, Sauvignon Blanc, Verdejo, and Viura / Macabeo

The vines are planted mainly as low bushes (en vaso) although new vineyards with irrigation tend to be planted on trellises. The planting density varies between 1,100 and 2,500 vines/ha.

References

External links
 D.O.P. Méntrida official website

Wine regions of Spain